The Kharal also spelled Kharral or Kharl is a very large feudal tribe centered in Punjab Region that was traditionally semi-pastoral and is classed as Jat or Rajput. Modern Indian and Pakistani census reports mention Kharals as Rajputs.

The Kharals predominantly inhabit the Western plains of Punjab (i.e. west of Lahore) that lie below the Salt Range and its surrounding areas. The Kharrals seem to be most concentrated in the Ravi River Valley between Lahore and the former Montgomery District, this corresponds well to Ain-i-Akbari (1595 CE) listing of Kharal Zamindaris in different Parganas. Historian and writer Amar Nath Bali says that the Kharral were of Rajput origin and became Jats after migrating to Punjab. A study by Punjabi University states Kharals inhabited western plains of Punjab and perhaps belonged to a Rajput tribe but subsequently recorded themselves as Jatts. A journal by Government College University lists Kharrals along other tribes as Rajputs.

The Kharals have numerous subdivisions some of which include Upera, Lakhera, Begke, Randhaira, Lalhaira, Rubera, Lodike[y], Dehar, Churiara, Khar, Bhandra, Doulo Kay and Gogera; the Kharals use many titles including Rai, Chaudhry, Malik and Mian but Rai is mostly used.

Rai Ahmad Khan Kharal is a historical Kharal personality who revolted against British in 1857 revolt and took leadership of many local tribes, he was shot while praying by British on September 21, 1857.

The Kharals are famous in the Indian Subcontinent due to the one of the great Punjabi tragic Romances called Mirza Sahiban. The stories protagonist is Mirza son of the Chief of the Kharal Jatts of Danabad and falls in love with his cousin Sahiban of the Sial Jatt tribe. To date there have been many film adaptations in both Pakistan and India of the Story of Mirza and Sahiban.

References

External links
Kharal and Berkley (19th century British India) on Dawn (newspaper)

Surnames
Jat clans of Punjab
Rajput clans of Punjab
Punjabi tribes
Punjabi-language surnames
Indian surnames
Hindu surnames